Galaxy Goof-Ups (also known as Yogi's Galaxy Goofs-Ups) is a 30-minute American animated television series, a spin-off of Yogi's Space Race and the fourth incarnation of the Yogi Bear franchise. The show was produced by Hanna-Barbera Productions and broadcast on NBC from September 9, 1978, to September 1, 1979.

The Galaxy Guardians—a.k.a. the "Galaxy Goof-ups"—consisted of Yogi Bear, Huckleberry Hound, Quack-Up and Scare Bear as space patrolmen under the leadership of Captain Snerdley; the four of them always goofed up while on duty, and spent most of their time in disco clubs. Despite their constant bumbling, however, they always emerged victorious.

The show originally aired as a segment on Yogi's Space Race from September 9 to October 28, 1978, and was the most popular segment on that show. Following the cancellation of Yogi's Space Race, Galaxy Goof-Ups was given its own half-hour timeslot on NBC beginning November 4, 1978. The show has been rebroadcast on USA Cartoon Express, Nickelodeon, TNT, Cartoon Network and Boomerang.

Quack-Up and Scare Bear have cameo appearances in Jellystone!

Characters
The "Galaxy Goof-Ups" characters (Yogi Bear, Scare Bear, Huckleberry Hound and Quack-Up) are all from Space Race, except for the following two new characters who are exclusive to this series:

Captain Snerdley: The Commander of the Galaxy Goof-Ups, Captain Snerdley is forced to put up with their clumsiness since they somehow solve the cases that they are assigned to. In "The Dopey Defenders", to make sure the new equipment will work better, he had installed a mechanism which keeps them from touching it.

General Bullhorn: Bullhorn is Snerdley's superior. He is unaware of the Goof-Ups' incompetence and blames Snerdley for whatever goes wrong. In one episode he is seen removing medals (along with pieces of uniform) from Snerdley every time they commit a blunder.

Cast
 Daws Butler as Yogi Bear, Huckleberry Hound, Son
 Joe Besser as Scare Bear
 Mel Blanc as Quack-Up
 John Stephenson as Captain Snerdley, General Blowhard, Papa
 Don Messick as Tacky Cat, Space-Spider
 Ted Cassidy as Drako
 Janet Waldo as Female Yogi look-alike

Additional

 Roger Behr
 B.J Cling
 Henry Corden
 Joan Gerber
 Marcy Goldman
 Bob Hastings

 Jim MacGeorge
 Ginny McSwain
 Marilyn Schreffler
 Alexis Tramunti
 Lennie Weinrib
 Frank Welker

Episodes

Production credits
 Executive Producers: Joseph Barbera and William Hanna Joe Ruby and Ken Spears
 Producer: Art Scott
 Directors: Ray Patterson, Carl Urbano
 Creative Producer: Iwao Takamoto
 Story Editor: Ray Parker
 Story: Haskell Barkin, Chuck Couch, Mark Fink, Ray Parker, Jim Ryan
 Story Direction: John Bruno, Ron Campbell, Carl Fallberg, Jan Green, Michael O'Connor, Don Sheppard, Paul Sommer, Tom Yakutis
 Recording Director: Art Scott
 Voices: Roger Behr, Joe Besser, Mel Blanc, Daws Butler, Ted Cassidy, B.J. Cling, Henry Corden, Joan Gerber, Marcy Goldman, Bob Hastings, Jim MacGeorge, Ginny McSwain, Don Messick, Marilyn Schreffler, John Stephenson, Alexis Tramunti, Janet Waldo, Lennie Weinrib, Frank Welker
 Graphics: Iraj Paran, Tom Wogatzke
 Title Design: Bill Perez
 Musical Director: Hoyt Curtin
 Musical Supervisor: Paul DeKorte
 Character Design: Willie Ito
 Layout Supervisors: Bill Hutten, Tony Love
 Layout: Dale Barnhart, Barry Bunce, Fred Crippen, Rene Garcia, George Goode, Dave Hanan, Sylvia Mattinson, Floyd Norman
 Song Sequences: Directed by Ken Mundie & Animated by Marija Dail
 Animation Supervisors: Bill Hutten, Tony Love
 Animation: Bob Alvarez, Cosmo Anzilotti, Bob Carr, Walt Kubiak, Ed Love, Jim Simon
 Background Supervisor: Al Gmuer
 Backgrounds: Deborah Akers, Dario Campanile, Marsha Hanes, James Hickey, Richard Khim, Fernando Montealgere, Andy Phillipson, Michael Reinman, Jeff Riche, Sera Segal-Alsberg, Stephen Thompson, Dennis Venizelos
 Animation Checking Supervisor: Rollie Greenwood
 Xerography: Yolanda Vallas
 Ink and Paint Supervisor: Shannon Bryant
 Sound Direction: Richard Olson, Bill Getty
 Camera: Robert Cohen, John Cunningham, Danny Larsen, Joe Ponticello
 Supervising Film Editor: Larry C. Cowan
 Dubbing Supervisor: Pat Foley
 Music Editor: Warner Leighton
 Effects Editors: Scott Hecker, Robert A. Rutledge
 Show Editor: Gil Iverson
 Negative Consultant: William E. DeBoer
 Production Supervisor: Peter Aries
 Production Manager: Jayne Barbera
 Post Production Supervisor: Joed Eaton

See also
 List of works produced by Hanna-Barbera
 List of Hanna-Barbera characters
 Yogi Bear (character)
 The Yogi Bear Show
 The Funtastic World of Hanna-Barbera
 The New Yogi Bear Show
 Yogi's Gang
 Yo Yogi!

References

External links
 
 

Yogi Bear television series
Huckleberry Hound television series
1970s American animated television series
1978 American television series debuts
1979 American television series endings
American children's animated comic science fiction television series
American children's animated space adventure television series
American animated television spin-offs
Animated television series about bears
Animated television series about dogs
NBC original programming
Crossover animated television series
Television series by Hanna-Barbera
Television series set on fictional planets